James Peter Fitzpatrick (June 2, 1892 – October 9, 1973) was an American rugby union player who competed in the 1920 Summer Olympics.

He was a member of the American rugby union team, which won the gold medal. Attended Santa Clara University for undergrad and Stanford University for his law degree. His gold medals are currently displayed at Santa Clara University's De Saisset Museum.

References

External links
profile

1892 births
1973 deaths
American rugby union players
Rugby union players at the 1920 Summer Olympics
Olympic gold medalists for the United States in rugby
United States international rugby union players
Medalists at the 1920 Summer Olympics